Blood Hunters (formerly titled One Drop) is a 2016 Canadian horror thriller film directed by Tricia Lee and starring Lara Gilchrist, Torri Higginson and Mark Taylor.

Cast
Lara Gilchrist as Ellie
Benjamin Arthur as Henry
Torri Higginson as Marion
Mark Taylor as George
Julian Richings as Father Stewart
Peter Blankenstein

Release
The film premiered at the London FrightFest Film Festival on August 29, 2016.  Then it was released on DVD, VOD and digital platforms in Canada and the United States on July 4, 2017.

Reception
The film has a 40% approval rating on Rotten Tomatoes based on 10 reviews, with an average rating of 5.3/10.  Gareth Jones of Dread Central awarded the film three stars out of five.  Barry Hertz of The Globe and Mail awarded the film two stars out of four.

Chris Knight of the National Post gave the film a negative review and wrote, "The actors do their best to invest Corey Brown’s headlong script with sympathy and a little gravitas, but sometimes it’s all they can do to draw breath."

References

External links
 
 

Canadian horror thriller films
English-language Canadian films
2016 horror thriller films
2016 horror films
2016 thriller films
2010s English-language films
2010s Canadian films